Lewis Howard Latimer (September 4, 1848 – December 11, 1928) was an American inventor and patent draftsman. His inventions included an evaporative air conditioner, an improved process for manufacturing carbon filaments for the  light bulbs, and an improved toilet system for railroad cars. In 1884, he joined the Edison Electric Light Company where he worked as a draftsman. The Lewis H. Latimer House, his landmarked former residence, is located near the Latimer Projects at 34-41 137th Street in Flushing, Queens, New York City.

Early life and family 

Lewis Howard Latimer was born in Chelsea, Massachusetts, on September 4, 1848, the youngest of the four children of Rebecca Latimer (1823–1910) and George Latimer (1818–1897). Before Lewis was born, his mother and father escaped from slavery in Virginia and fled to Chelsea, Massachusetts on October 4, 1842. The day they arrived in Boston, George was recognized by a colleague of his former slave owner and was arrested a few days later, on October 20, 1842. George's trial received great notoriety; he was represented by Frederick Douglass and William Lloyd Garrison. He was eventually able to purchase his freedom and live with his family in Chelsea, Massachusetts.

When Latimer was young he spent time (before his father left) helping his father in his barbershop. Lewis Latimer also spent time at night hanging wallpaper with his father.

When Latimer was 10, his mother decided to split the family after the Dred Scott case ruled individual slaves needed to prove they had the consent of their owner to legally become free; many slaves at the time such as the Latimers had lived free by escaping into free states and becoming state citizens who often would not be sent back to their owners if apprehended by interstate slave catchers. This caused Lewis's father, George Latimer, to flee for his family's safety because he had nothing to prove he was free from enslavement. So, he fled to protect his family.

After his father had to flee and his mother had to split the family, Lewis and his brothers were sent to a farm school, and his sisters were sent to stay with a family friend.

Lewis Howard Latimer joined the U.S. Navy at the age of 16 on September 16, 1864, and served as a Landsman on the USS Massasoit. After receiving an honorable discharge from the U.S. Navy on July 3, 1865, he gained employment as an office boy with a patent law firm, Crosby Halstead and Gould, with a $3.00 per week salary. He learned how to use a set square, ruler, and other drafting tools. Later, after his boss recognized his talent for sketching patent drawings, Latimer was promoted to the position of head draftsman earning $20.00 a week by 1872 ($438.59 today).

Lewis H. Latimer married Mary Wilson Lewis on November 15, 1873, in Fall River, Massachusetts. Mary was born in Providence, Rhode Island, the daughter of Louisa M. and William Lewis. The couple had two daughters, Emma Jeanette (1883–1978) and Louise Rebecca (1890–1963). Jeanette married Gerald Fitzherbert Norman, the first black person hired as a high school teacher in the New York City public school system, and had two children: Winifred Latimer Norman (1914–2014), a social worker who served as the guardian of her grandfather's legacy, and Gerald Latimer Norman (1911–1990), who became an administrative law judge.

In 1879, Latimer and his wife, Mary, moved to Bridgeport, Connecticut, along with his mother, Rebecca, and his brother, William. They settled in a neighborhood called "Little Liberia," which had been established in the early 19th century by free blacks. (The landmark Mary and Eliza Freeman Houses are the last surviving buildings on their original foundations of this community.) Other family members already living there were his brother, George A. Latimer, his wife, Jane, his sister, Margaret, and her husband, Augustus T. Hawley, and their children. Mary died in Bridgeport in 1924.

Career

Inventions and technical work 
In 1874, Latimer co-patented (with Charles M. Brown) an improved toilet system for railroad cars called the Water Closet for Railroad Cars (U.S. Patent 147,363).

In 1876, Alexander Graham Bell employed Latimer, then a draftsman at Bell's patent law firm, to draft the necessary drawings required to receive a patent for Bell's telephone.

In 1879, he moved to Bridgeport, Connecticut, and was hired as assistant manager and draftsman for the U.S. Electric Lighting Company, a company owned by Hiram Maxim, a rival of Thomas A. Edison. While Latimer was there he invented a modification to the process for making carbon filaments which aimed to reduce breakages during the carbonization process. This modification consisted of placing filament blanks inside a cardboard envelope during carbonization. While in England on behalf of the Maxim light company he taught the entire process for making Maxim lights, including glassblowing in 9 months to get the factory up and running.

In 1884, he was invited to work with Thomas Edison. Along with the work he did with Edison, he was also responsible for translating data into German and French, as well as gathering that information.

Latimer also developed a forerunner of the air conditioner called "Apparatus for cooling and disinfecting".

In 1894, Latimer pursued a patent on a safety elevator that prevented the riders from falling out and into the shaft.

In 1924, after the Board of Patent Control dissolved Latimer went on to work with Hammer and Schwartz until he retired.

Edison Pioneers 
On February 11, 1918, Latimer joined the Edison Pioneers.  Lewis Latimer was the first person of color to join this group of 100.

Light bulb 

Latimer received a patent on September 13th, 1881, along with Joseph V. Nichols, for a method of attaching carbon filaments to conducting wires within an electric lamp, and another patent on January 17, 1882, for a "process of manufacturing carbons", a method for the production of carbon filaments for lightbulbs which reduced breakages during the production process by wrapping the filaments in a cardboard envelope.

The Edison Electric Light Company in New York City hired Latimer in 1884 as a draftsman and an expert witness in patent litigation on electric lights. While at Edison, Latimer wrote the first book on electric lighting, entitled Incandescent Electric Lighting (1890), and supervised the installation of public electric lights throughout New York, Philadelphia, Montreal, and London.

When that company was combined in 1892 with the Thomson-Houston Electric Company to form General Electric, he continued to work in the legal department.

In 1911, he became a patent consultant to law firms.

Patents 
  "Improvement in water-closets for railroad-cars" (with Brown, Charles W.), February 10, 1874
  "Electric lamp" (with Nichols, Joseph V.), September 13, 1881
  "Process of Manufacturing Carbons", January 17, 1882
  "Supporter for electric lamps" (with Tregoning, John), March 21, 1882
  "Apparatus for cooling and disinfecting", January 12, 1886
  "Locking rack for hats, coats, and umbrellas", March 24, 1896
  "Book Supporter", February 7, 1905
  "Lamp fixture" (with Norton, William Sheil), August 30, 1910

Military and draftsman 
Lewis Howard Latimer joined the U.S. Navy at the age of 15 on September 16, 1863, and served as a Landsman on the USS Massasoit. After receiving an honorable discharge from the U.S. Navy on July 3, 1865, he gained employment as an office boy with a patent law firm, Crosby Halstead and Gould, with a $10.00 per week salary. He learned how to use a set square, ruler, and other drafting tools. Later, after his boss recognized his talent for sketching patent drawings, Latimer was promoted to the position of head draftsman earning $20.00 a week by 1872.

Even though Latimer was no longer active military he remained patriotic.  He was an early and active member of the veteran organization, Grand Army of the Republic.  He acted as secretary and adjutant.

Writing 

 A book of poetry called Poems of Love and Life.
 A technical book, Incandescent Electric Lighting (1890).
 Various pieces for African-American journals.
 A petition to Mayor Seth Low to restore a member to the Brooklyn School Board.

Latimer played the violin and flute, painted portraits, and wrote plays.

He was an early advocate of civil rights.  In 1895 Lewis wrote a statement in connection with the National Conference of Colored Men about equality, security, and opportunity.

Teaching 
Latimer taught English and drafting courses to immigrants at the Henry Street Settlement in New York.

Death and legacy 
For 25 years, from 1903 until he died in 1928, Latimer lived with his family in a home on Holly Avenue in what is known now as East Flushing section of Queens, New York. Latimer died on December 11, 1928, at the age of 80. Approximately sixty years after his death, his home was moved from Holly Avenue to 137th Street in Flushing, Queens, which is about 1.4 miles northwest of its original location.
 Latimer is an inductee of the National Inventors Hall of Fame for his work on electric filament manufacturing techniques.
 The Latimer family house is on Latimer Place in Flushing, Queens. It was moved from the original location to a nearby small park and turned into the Lewis H. Latimer House Museum in honor of the inventor.
 Latimer was a founding member of the Flushing, New York, Unitarian Church.
 A set of apartment houses in Flushing are called "Latimer Gardens".
 P.S. 56 in Clinton Hill, Brooklyn, is named Lewis H. Latimer School.
 An invention program at the Massachusetts Institute of Technology, MIT, is named after him.
On May 10, 1968, a school in Brooklyn, New York was rededicated to The Lewis H. Latimer School in his memory.
In 1988, a committee was formed, the Lewis H. Latimer Committee, to save his home in Flushing, New York.

See also
 The Current War

References

External links 

 Lewis Latimer at the IEEE
 Lewis Howard Latimer: Inventor, Engineer (Mechanical and Electrical)
 Bibliography about Latimer and scans of pages from his book
 Lewis Latimer: Renaissance Man by Luvenia George for the Smithsonian Institution's Lemelson Center for the Study of Invention and Innovation
 Teachers' guide by Luvenia George on Latimer, published by the Smithsonian Institution's Lemelson Center for the Study of Invention and Innovation
 "Blueprint for Change", a 1995 exhibition honoring Latimer at the which holds a collection of his papers and artifacts.
 Lewis Latimer biography at About.com
 Profile of Lewis Latimer – The Black Inventor Online Museum
 
 A video tour by New York Landmarks of the Lewis Latimer House Museum, where he lived from 1902 to 1928.

1848 births
1928 deaths
People from Chelsea, Massachusetts
Edison Pioneers
19th-century American inventors
20th-century American inventors
African-American inventors
Grand Army of the Republic officials
19th-century African-American people
20th-century African-American people